Islamic University, Bangladesh, commonly referred to as Islamic University, Kushtia shortly IU, is one of the major public research and PhD granting universities in Bangladesh and the largest seat of higher education in the south-west part of the country. It is the only university in Bangladesh where a specialized stream of Theology and seven others academic divisions/faculties: Engineering and Technology, Humanities, Social Sciences, Sciences, Biological Sciences, Business Administration and Law are running parallel in a multicultural atmosphere. It is financed by the Government of Bangladesh through University Grants Commission, Bangladesh. On 22 November 1979, the foundation of the Islamic University was set up in Kushtia, and it is operated under the Islamic University Act of 1980. Islamic University began operations on 28 June 1986. It is the seventh oldest university in the country and the first university in Bangladesh established after the independence from Pakistan (then West Pakistan) in 1971. It offers undergraduate, graduate, M Phil and PhD degrees.

History

On 1 December 1976 then government announced the establishment of the Islamic University to promote a coordinated approach to Islamic education and general education in the country. Islamic University, Kushtia was founded on 22 November 1979 at Shantidanga-Dulalpur (Kushtia-Jhenidah) by then President of Bangladesh General Ziaur Rahman, based on the recommendation of ‘Islamic University Planning Committee’ on 7 January 1977 headed by M. A. Bari including seven other members.

The Islamic University Act was passed in the National Assembly of Bangladesh on 27 December 1980.

The objective of establishing Islamic University is "to provide for instruction in theology and other fields of Islamic Studies and comparative jurisprudence and such other branches of learning at Graduate and Postgraduate level as the University may think fit and make provision for research including Post-Doctorate research and training for the advancement and dissemination of knowledge"

On 1 January 1981 the government of Bangladesh appointed A. N. M Momtaz Uddin Choudhury as the first vice-chancellor and the university became operational that year.

As construction of several important buildings began, a presidential decree was issued on 15 May 1982 to shift the university from Shantidanga-Dulalpur (Kushtia-Jhenaidah) to Boardbazar, Gazipur on an area of 50 acres. The construction of an academic building, two residential halls and other necessary infrastructures were completed. Initially two faculties (Faculty of Theology and Islamic Studies, Faculty of Humanities and Social Sciences) with four departments (Al-Quran and Islamic Studies, Dawah and Islamic Studies, Accounting and Information System, Management) were established and 300 students were enrolled in the session of 1985–86.

In 1987, two more departments (Economics, Law) were established.

On 28 December 1988, while the infrastructure development and academic activities were in full swing, the university was again shifted to Shantidanga-Dulalpur (Kushtia-Jhenidah).

In 1991 five more departments — Bengali, English, Arabic, Islamic History, and Public Administration — were established.

In 1992, one more departments (Al Hadith and Islamic Studies) were established.

In 1995 three other departments — of Electrical and Electronic Engineering, Applied Chemistry and Chemical Engineering, and Computer Science and Engineering— were established.

In 1998 three other departments — Information and Communication Technology, Biotechnology and Genetic Engineering, and Applied Nutrition and Food Technology — were established.

In 2007 two more departments Mathematics, and Al-Fiqh and Legal Studies— were established.

In 2009 two more departments Finance and Banking, and Statistics— were established.

In 2015 three more departments — Folklore Studies, Political Science, and Marketing— were opened.

In 2017, 8 more departments— Law and Land Management, Development Studies, Social Welfare, Biomedical Engineering, Pharmacy, Environmental Science & Geography, Human Resources Management, Tourism and Hospitality Management — were established.

In 2019 the department of Fine Arts was added to the Faculty of Arts.

In 2021 the department of Mass Communication & Journalism was added to the Faculty of Social Science.

In 2022 the department of Physical Education and Sports Science was added to the Faculty of Science.

Currently there are 36 departments under 8 faculties i. e. Faculty of Theology & Islamic Studies, Faculty of Arts, Faculty of Social Sciences, Faculty of Law, Faculty of Business Administration, Faculty of Sciences, Faculty of Engineering & Technology, and Faculty of Biological Sciences.

It may be mentioned that the department of Information and Communication Technology of Islamic University in Kushtia was opened in 1998 as the pioneer department in that name in Bangladesh. In addition, "ICE Innovation Lab", the first ever Internet of Things (IoT) Lab in Bangladesh, was inaugurated at the department of Information and Communication Engineering (ICE) of Islamic University (IU) in Kushtia on 21 September 2016. Three former students of the department contributed to the procurement of all the Internet of Things (IoT)-related equipment including Sensor, Raspberry pi, Arduino, Sheild etc. for the Innovation Lab.

On 23 June 2009, an Act of the Parliament assigned the President as chancellor, replacing the Prime Minister. On 21 August 2016, Harun-Ur-Rashid Askari of English department of Kushtia Islamic University was appointed its 12th Vice Chancellor. The 'Bangabandhu Chair' was established at IU under Bangla department on 20 July 2017 to carry out extensive research on the life, political activities and ideology of the Bangabandhu Sheikh Mujibur Rahman, the Father of the Nation. Shamsuzzaman Khan, former director general of Bangla Academy, was appointed as 'Bangabandhu Chair' Professor at Islamic University (IU) in Kushtia on 1 October 2018.

Administration 
The chancellor is the ceremonial head of the university who appoints the vice-chancellor. The position is held by the incumbent President of Bangladesh, the Head of State of Bangladesh. The vice-chancellor is the executive head of the university. Present and the 13th vice-chancellor is Shaikh Abdus Salam, who was appointed on 29 September 2020.

List of vice-chancellors 
 A. N. M Momtaz Uddin (from 9 February 1979 to 27 December 1988)
 Muhammad Sirazul Islam (from 28 December 1988 to 17 June 1991)
 Muhammad Abdul Hamid (from 18 June 1991 to 21 March 1995)
 Muhammad Enam-Ul Haque (from 9 May 1995 to 2 September 1997)
 Qaisuddin (from 3 September 1997 to 19 October 2000)
 Muhammad Lutfar Rahman (from 20 October 2000 to 3 November 2001)
 Muhammad Mustafizur Rahman (from 10 December 2001 to 2 April 2004)
 M. Rafiqul Islam (from 3 April 2004 to 10 July 2006)
 Foyez Muhammad Sirazul Haque (from 10 August 2006 to 8 March 2009)
 M. Alauddin (from 9 March 2009 to 27 December 2012)
 Abdul Hakim Sarkar (from 27 December 2012 to 30 June 2016)
 Md. Harun-Ur-Rashid Askari (from 21 August 2016 to 20 August 2020)
 Shaikh Abdus Salam (from 30 September 2020 to present).

List of pro vice-chancellor 
 Kamal Uddin (3 March 2009 to January 2013)
 M. Shahinoor Rahman (20 February 2013 to 19 February 2017)
 M. Shahinoor Rahman (23 February 2017 to 22 February 2021)
 Mahbubur Rahman (30 June 2021 to present)

Notable persons
In Islamic University, Bangladesh has many notable people, like students and faculty.

Notable faculty 
 A. N. M Momtaz Uddin Choudhury - First Vice Chancellor and project director of Islamic University, Bangladesh
 Maimul Ahsan Khan - scholar of jurisprudence and comparative law and former Professor of IU
 Khandaker Abdullah Jahangir - Islamic scholar and former Professor of IU. 
 Abubakar Muhammad Zakaria - Islamic scholar and Professor of IU. 
 Abdus Sattar (Chemist) - Ex Vice-Chancellor, Jashore University of Science & Technology (JUST).
 Abul Ahsan Chowdhury - writer, researcher and former professor, Department of Bengali, IU
 Foyez Muhammad Sirazul Haque - academic and Ex-Vice Chancellor, IU
 Harun-Ur-Rashid Askari - Bengali-English writer, fictionist, academic, media personality and the 12th Vice Chancellor, IU
 M. Alauddin - academic, chemist and Ex-Vice Chancellor, IU
 Shamsuzzaman Khan - ex-director general of Bangla Academy and Bangabandhu Chair Professor, IU
 A B M Shawkat Ali - writer, physicist and ex-assistant professor of the Department of CSE, IU
 Mohammad Yusuf Siddiq - historian, epigraphist, researcher, professor and author

Notable alumni 
 Mohammad Ali Moni - clinical bioinformatics scientist
 Shihab Shaheen - film director, producer and screenwriter
 Fahima Khatun - cricketer on the Bangladesh women's national cricket team
 Mehedi Hasan Royal - forward for the Bangladesh national football team
 Mohammad Shamsuddin - Bangladeshi sprinter who competed at the 2004 Summer Olympics
 Sohrab Uddin - Bangladesh Nationalist Party member of parliament

Academics

Faculties and departments 
At present the university offers academic programs through its 36 departments under 8 faculties and one self-contained Institute of Islamic Education and Research (IIER). The government-approved recent organogram of the university sets out to operate 59 departments and 3 self-contained Institutes. The faculty-wise distribution of departments is as follows:

Faculty of Theology and Islamic Studies
Degree awarded: BTIS (Hons.), MTIS, MPhil & PhD.

There are three departments under this faculty and the medium of instructions are Arabic, English & Bengali based on subjects, which are:

Faculty of Engineering and Technology 
Islamic University offers various Engineering Programs in different branches of engineering sciences in Undergraduate (Bachelor of Science in Engineering; B.Sc. Engg.) and Graduate level (Master of Science in Engineering; M.Sc. Engg).

Degree Awarded: B.Sc.Engg./B.Engg., M.Sc.Engg./M.Engg., M.Phil. & PhD.

There are five departments including applied/engineering sciences under this faculty and the medium of instruction & examination is English, which are:

It's mentionable that the name of the department of Information and Communication Engineering (ICE) has been changed to Information and Communication Technology (ICT).

Faculty of Biological Sciences
Degree Awarded: B.Pharm., M.Pharm., B.Sc.(Hons.), M.Sc. & PhD.

There are three departments including applied/biological sciences under this faculty and the medium of instruction & examination is English, which are:

Faculty of Sciences
Degree Awarded: B.Sc.(Hons.), M.Sc., M.Phil. & PhD.

There are four departments including physical/mathematical sciences under this faculty and the medium of instruction & examination is English, which are:

Faculty of Business Administration
Degree Awarded: BBA, MBA, M.Phil. & PhD.

There are six departments under this faculty and the medium of instruction & examination is English, which are:

Faculty of Arts
Degree Awarded: B.A.(Hons.), M.A., M.Phil. & PhD.

There are five departments under this faculty and the medium of instructions are English, Bengali & Arabic based on each department individually, which are:

Faculty of Social Sciences
Degree Awarded: B.A.(Hons.), B.S.S(Hons.), M.A., M.S.S., M.Phil. & PhD.

There are seven departments under this faculty and the medium of instructions are English based on each department, which are:

Faculty of Law
Degree Awarded: LLB, LLM, M.Phil. & PhD.

There are three departments under this faculty and the medium of instructions are English, Bengali & Arabic based on each department individually .

Academic buildings 
There are academic buildings in IU to operate academic activities of 36 departments, which are:

Institutes
Presently IU has one institute, Institute of Islamic Education and Research (IIER). B.Ed., M.Ed., Diploma, Diploma in Library and Information Science, Junior Diploma in Chinese Language programs are conducted by this institute. By 2021, a total of three institutes will be established at IU as per newly approved program of the university.

Libraries
The University Library, housed in a separate four-storey building, is one of the biggest in Bangladesh. It is named 'Khademul Haramain Badshah Fahd bin Abdul Aziz Central Library '. There are thousands of books and volumes, including bound volumes of periodicals. In addition, It subscribes to hundred of foreign journals. It has an advanced level E-Library Teachers, students and researchers are able to read all journals, books research papers and articles, by using the E-Library facilities. Students have to be member of the library till their studentship in the university. The library has 'Bangabandhu Corner' Muktijuddho Corner (Liberation War Corner) which provides the opportunity to learn the history of independence of Bangladesh against then Pakistan.

Moreover, every academic department of the university has its own seminar library for its students, from where students can borrow books for a month. Academic journals, international research papers also available in the departmental library. In addition, every hall of residence has its own library, give opportunities to the residential students to read books, journals, newspapers and borrow books.

Convocations
The first convocation of the university was held on 27 April 1993. Since then, a second convocation was held on 5 December 1999 and the third on 28 March 2002. The 4th convocation of Islamic University (IU), Kushtia, was held on 7 January 2018.

Collaboration and MoU
  Northwestern University Pritzker School of Law, United States (MoU)
  Nagasaki University, Japan (Academic Cooperation)
  Kangwon National University, South Korea (International collaboration of Biological Research)
  Chonbuk National University, South Korea ( Research Cooperation)
  Confucius Institute, China (Establishment of the Confucius Institute Chinese Teaching Site)
  Sultan Sharif Ali Islamic University, Brunei Darussalam (MoU)
  Yunnan University, China
  Okayama University, Japan
  Okayama University of Science, Japan
  Visva-Bharati University, India
  Kafkas University, Turkey
  Cankiri Karatekin University, Turkey
  Yıldız Technical University, Turkey(MoU)
  University of Tampere, Finland (MoU with IU Public Administration Department)

Enrollment

Undergraduate (Bachelor's) 
Before starting every academic session, applications for admission into undergraduate studies are asked by IU authority and prepares detailed prospectus on the admission process including qualifications criteria i.e. cumulative grade points average of Secondary level (S.S.C or equivalent to Grade-10), Higher Secondary level (H.S.C or equivalent to Grade-12), Diploma, A level, O level etc. The prospectus also include units’ distribution on different subjects under different faculties, seat capacity, examinations fee and particular date to be held the examinations.  The Undergraduate admission test is one of the competitive examinations in Bangladesh.

After completion of twelve years of studies or higher secondary level (H.S.C or equivalent to Grade-12) education, a student can submit her or his application for undergraduate admission if he/she fulfills the minimum requirements. There are 8 units (A to H) for admission test; each unit has its unique questions patterns .i.e. applicants are required to answer questions on physics, mathematics, chemistry, biology, English etc. based on the unit's subjects type to be admitted under Faculty of Applied Science and Technology.

For the faculty of Business Administrations, applicants are required to answer questions on business studies, accounting, general knowledge, and mathematics.  For the Faculty of Law and Shariah, applicants are required to answer questions on English, Bengali, and general knowledge. For the Faculty of Humanities and Social Sciences, applicants are required to answer questions on English, Bengali, and general Knowledge. For the Faculty of Theology and Islamic Studies, applicants are required to answer questions on Arabic, Al-Quran, Al-Hadith, Dawah & Islamic studies, Al-Fiqh, Islamic history, English, Bengali, and general knowledge.

Graduate (Master's) 
For admission to Master's programs, eligible candidates are required to appear in interviews and/or written tests.

Graduate research (M.Phil or Ph.D)

Before starting every academic session, applications for admission into postgraduate studies i.e. M.Phil. or Ph.D. are asked by IU authority and prepares details prospectus on the admission process including qualifications criteria i.e. cumulative grade points average of Secondary level (S.S.C or equivalent to Grade-10), Higher Secondary level (H.S.C or equivalent to Grade-12), Diploma, A level, O level, percentage of marks in the bachelor studies, and number of publications or research papers etc.

Graduate diploma
IU offers a 1-year diploma in Library and Information Science and a 1-year Junior Diploma in Chinese Language under Institute of Islamic Education and Research (IIRR).

International Student Affairs & Admission Cell (ISAC)
IU also welcomes foreign students every year for undergraduate, graduate and postgraduate research programs MPhil, PhD, enrollment process is conducted by International Student Affairs & Admission Cell (ISAC) at IU. Students can be admitted at IU from SAARC countries, South Asian Countries Middle East countries specially from Nepal, India, Pakistan, Sri Lanka, Maldives, Bhutan, Somalia, Cambodia, Afghanistan and Indonesia.

Computer Centre
Islamic University Computer Centre was established in order to accelerating research facilities for faculty, staff and students. Present Director of the Computer Centre is Paresh Chandra Barman. The Information and Communications Technology (ICT) CELL is to deliver technology services to support the Teaching, Learning, Research and Administrative goals of the university, managed by the Computer Centre.

Magazines, journals and research bulletins
 Journal of Islamic University (IU Journal )
 Journal of the Faculty of Applied Science and Technology
 Journal of the Faculty of Business Administration
 Islamic University Studies
 Swapno literary magazine
 "Mukta Bangla" literary magazine

Innovations and achievements
 17 teachers from different faculties of IU have been ranked among world's best scientists ( Researchers) in the AD Scientific index published in October 2021.
 The Intelligent Smart and Versatile Home Security System was designed by Niaz Mustakim, an M.Sc. student of the Electrical and Electronic Engineering (EEE) Department. It can be used for everyday tasks like opening and closing doors, switching lights and air-conditioning on and off, as well as warning of dangers such as gas leaks and fire.
 A robot was invented by ASM Shamim Hasan, an M.Sc. student of the Electrical and Electronic Engineering (EEE) Department. The device is capable of collecting information from spaces which are usually out of the reach of humans.
 IU is four times champions in football, two times in basketball and fourteen times in volleyball at the Bangladesh inter-universities sports competition. Moreover, some IU students played in the Asian games and Olympic games for the Bangladesh National Team and acquired prizes at that competition.
 Evening primrose (a special species of sunflower, a flower of winter-prone country) is cultivated first time in the climate of Bangladesh by the researchers of the Department of Biotechnology and Genetic Engineering (BTGE). After trying for almost a year and a half under the leadership of Jahangir Alam, the researchers have been able to cultivate this flower in the country's climate through tissue culture. The other members of the research team is Anwarul Haque Swapon, Mostafa Shakil, Jubayer Hussain, Sadrul Hasan Chowdhury, Zahurul Islam, Zulkar Nain and others.

Conferences and workshops

Islamic University regularly organizes national and international seminars, conferences and workshops in its campus. Among them the following are notable:
 2009 - Networking and ISP Setup workshop.
 2015 - National Workshop on Networking and ISP set up (System Administration) using LINUX.
 2015 - International seminar on ‘Role of Microbial Proteases in their own metabolism and host Infection’
 2016 - Seminar on self-assessment.
 2016 - Workshop on 'Effective Teaching of English: Best Practice' on 30 July 2016, jointly organized by the English Department and Bangladesh English Language Teachers Association(BELTA), sponsored by the American Centre, US Embassy, Dhaka.
 2016 - A three-day workshop on 'Pure Pronunciation, News Presentation and Recitation’
 2016 - A career camp on ‘Information and Communication Technology’
 2017 - A two-day national workshop on 'Bioinformatics and Computational Biology'.
 2017 - An international conference on ‘The Role of Nutrition in Health and Development’.
 2017 - A seminar on 'Regression Analysis and Environmental Statistics'.
 2017 - An international seminar on ‘Contemporary Trends in Folklore'.
 2017 - Idea Innovation Workshop for Mobile Games and Apps Development.
 2017 - A four day-long training on "Active Citizens Youth Leadership, organized by British Council and Democracy Watch.
 2017 - A seminar on "Photon beam commissioning of an eleckta Synergy linear accelerator".
 2017 - A seminar on "Collaboration with Canadian Universities" 
 2018 - An international seminar on "The influence of world literature on the Tagorean characterization of women" was held on 3 March 2018.
 2018 - A seminar on "Role of University to Revive River Economy".
 2018 - An international seminar on ‘Management Practices in Bangladesh and Challenges of Twenty First Century’.
 2018 - An international seminar on 'Historical and Linguistic Features of Arabic Language'.
 2018 - An international seminar on "Innovation of Healthy Products through Biotechnology" "Innovation of Healthy Products through Biotechnology"
 2018 - A seminar on "Arsenic in Coconut Water".
 2019 - An international seminar on "Music and performing arts as the exposition of Lalon's philosophy".
 2019 - 7th ICSDAP Biennial International Conference on 'Social Unrest, Peace and Development' held on 14–15 September 2019 at Islamic University.
 2019 - 2nd International Conference on Nursi Studies in Bangladesh "Global Peace and Harmony: The Risala-i Nur Perspective" 28–29 January 2019.
 2019 - An international seminar on 'Natural products for drug discovery and development' was held on 26 June 2019, organized by Applied Chemistry and Chemical Engineering Department of IU.
 2019 - An international seminar on ‘Contemporary challenges for international humanitarian law’ was held on 8 July 2019, jointly organized by IU Law Faculty and International Committee of the Red Cross (ICRC).
 2020 - Seminar on cultural dilemma held at IU.
 2021 - Seminar on metabolic syndrome.
 2022 - ASM Microbiology Quiz Competition-2022, a seminar was held on 3rd September, jointly arranged by Department of Biotechnology and Genetic Engineering and American Society for Microbiology.

Baishakah (Bengali New Year) and Science Fair/Carnival

The university authorities organize the Baishakah (Bengali New Year) and Science Fair every year on the occasion of celebrating Pahela Baishakh and the Bengali New Year. On the occasion, the IU authority organize cultural programs like concert, stages drama, scientific and technological projects show etc.

Student life and facilities

Student body 
The university has about 16,000 regular students. There are eight residential halls for students, including four of 2000 seats for male and three of 1500 seats for female students.  This capacity is not enough and students usually live in two adjacent cities, Kushtia and Jheniadah.

Halls of residence 
The university has eight residential halls for students, five for males and three for females. They are:

Transportation 
The university runs its own regular bus services to and from the Kushtia and Jhenidah district towns. Although, it has a total of 47 Bus to ensure transportation facilities of the students, teacher officers and support staff residing inside and outside of the campus, but it is not adequate.  In addition, VC, Pro-VC and Treasurer use university Car for their transportation facilities.
 16 university's own bus (one double-decker bus for students)
 31 hired buses (two double-decker buses for students)
 2 university's own ambulance
 4 university's own minibus

Health services 
Health services are provided by a medical center at the campus. The medical center is situated near the Mir Mosharraf Hossain Academic Building and Mofiz Lake. The medical center offers free medical service and free pathological examinations to students, teachers and staffs of the university and also family members of the teachers and staffs. The Centre provides service round the clock, seven days a week, with 11 doctors working in different shifts. The centre also has dental unit, eye unit, x-ray department and two ambulances. The centre has in its premises arrangement for 05 bed accommodation so that students suffering from such contagious diseases as chickenpox or mumps may be taken care of in isolation.

Cafeteria 
There is a central cafeteria, situated within the central auditorium's south side.  Moreover, every faculty building, library, residential halls have cafeterias on the campus.

Islamic University Theatre 
Islamic University Theatre (IUT) was established in 1991 by students. On 21 October 2021, IU theatre celebrated its 30th birth anniversary. Every now and then drama is staged at the Student Teacher Cultural Centre.

Sports 
IU has two large playgrounds, one is for cricket and another for football. These two are used as venue of annual athletics competition of the university as well as cricket, football, and hockey competitions. Moreover, these two venues are very popular for inter-university football and cricket competition. Students can access the facility all year round. IU has tennis court beside the gymnasium building. It also has a gymnasium cum indoor stadium near the halls of residence where students can do gymnastics and play basketball, badminton during leisure, and this gymnasium is used almost every year for inter-university basketball, badminton competition. Also this university has won the inter-university football competition five times into Bangladesh.

Tamanna Khatun student of IU, who won a gold medal in the Youth World Hockey Championship held in South Africa in 2006. Mohammad Shamsuddin competed in the 100 meters at the 2004 Athens Olympics and Abdullah al hil Kafi, a famous athlete, who represented Bangladesh in South Korean Sports in 2003. Fahima Khatun and Mehedi Hasan Royal are national woman cricket and man football team member.

Ranking

International ranking 
In Edition 2021 according to Webometrics university ranking website, Islamic University, Bangladesh ranked 4218th out of 30,000 universities worldwide. In 2019-20 session Islamic University was ranked 9321th position into worldwide 13,800 universities by 4icu.org website. Another side the edurank.org website ranks the Islamic University, Bangladesh 6209th position out of 16,954 universities. Russian university ranking website unipage.net ranks Islamic University, Bangladesh 4355th position out of 28,000 universities worldwide in 2020.

National ranking 
In 2021 by Webometrics university ranking website, Islamic University, Bangladesh came 25th out of Bangladeshi public-private universities. According to 4icu.org website Islamic University placed 42nd among Bangladeshi universities. Russian university ranking website unipage.net ranks Islamic University, 16th position out of 128 Bangladesh universities in 2020. The edurank.org website ranks the Islamic University, Bangladesh 23th position among 129 universities of Bangladesh.

University School & College 

Islamic University has a 'Laboratory School & College' of secondary level and higher secondary level education inside the campus for children. The school & college also receives general students from outside of the campus.

Photo gallery

References

External links

 IU Official website
 Islamic University Reporters Unity, Kushtia

Islamic University, Bangladesh
Public universities of Bangladesh
Educational institutions established in 1985
1985 establishments in Bangladesh
Islamic universities and colleges in Bangladesh
Organisations based in Khulna
Educational institutions of Khulna Division
Universities and colleges in Kushtia District
Organisations based in Kushtia District